The Battle of the Scarpe refers to a number of battles fought on the Western Front during World War I in the Nord-Pas-de-Calais region of France:

Battle of the Scarpe (1917), three battles that occurred during the Arras Offensive between 9 April and 4 May 1917. 
Battle of the Scarpe (1918), fought during the Hundred Days' Offensive between 26 and 30 August 1918.